Hustlers is a 2019 American crime comedy-drama film written and directed by Lorene Scafaria, based on New York magazine's 2015 article "The Hustlers at Scores" by Jessica Pressler. The film stars Constance Wu, Jennifer Lopez, Julia Stiles, Keke Palmer, Lili Reinhart, Lizzo, and Cardi B. It follows a crew of New York City strippers who begin to steal money by drugging stock traders and CEOs who visit their club, then running up their credit cards. Lopez also served as a producer on the film through Nuyorican Productions, alongside Jessica Elbaum, Will Ferrell, and Adam McKay through their Gloria Sanchez banner.

First announced in February 2016, the film was originally set to be financed and distributed by Annapurna Pictures. However, amid financial trouble, Annapurna dropped the rights in October 2018. After STX Entertainment picked them up, much of the cast joined that fall through the following spring, and filming took place in New York City from March to May 2019.

Hustlers had its world premiere on September 7, 2019, at the Toronto International Film Festival, and was theatrically released in the United States on September 13, 2019. The film received positive reviews from critics, with particular praise for Lopez's performance, and grossed $157.6 million worldwide against a production budget of $20.7 million.

Plot

In 2014, Elizabeth, a journalist, is working on a story involving former New York City-based stripper Dorothy, known as Destiny, and Destiny's former friend and mentor, Ramona Vega.

Seven years prior, Destiny is working at Moves, a strip club, to support her grandmother, but is barely getting by. Mesmerized by Ramona's performance and the money she earns, Destiny strikes up a conversation. Ramona agrees to take Destiny under her wing, and the two form a formidable team. Destiny enjoys newfound wealth and a deep friendship with Ramona. A year later, the financial crisis of 2007–2008 strikes, and both women find themselves out of a job and lose touch. During this period, Destiny becomes a struggling single parent who has difficulty finding a job.

With no other options, Destiny returns to dancing. However, Moves has changed: the financial crisis has impacted the number of customers, and the club is primarily staffed by dancers from Russia regularly willing to perform sex acts for money, a line Destiny crosses in a moment of desperation. She reconnects with Ramona, who introduces her to her new hustle. Along with her two protegées, Mercedes and Annabelle, Ramona targets rich men at bars. The women pretend to drink with each target while secretly lacing the men's drinks with a ketamine/MDMA mix; once inebriated, they are escorted to Moves where the crew has negotiated a set cut rate that they receive based on how much they are able to charge on their targets' credit card.

The hustle proves itself to be very lucrative, and the women enjoy their new source of wealth. However, other strippers begin to emulate their strategies of bringing the clubs clients for a cut. Furious, Ramona cuts her business ties with Moves, reasoning that they can keep the entirety of what they earn; the group begins to service clients in hotel rooms or their own homes. Mercedes and Annabelle become uncomfortable with the new practice and no longer reliably show up, so Ramona hires ladies with drug problems and criminal records as well as sourcing strangers as new clients against Destiny's advice.

Destiny's fears prove true when a client Ramona booked for Mercedes suffers a near-fatal accident and she must take him to the hospital when Ramona cannot be reached, with Mercedes bailing out in the process. It is revealed that Ramona had again been preoccupied with bailing Dawn, a drug-addicted new hire whom Destiny finds sloppy and unreliable, out of jail. Upon returning home, Destiny finds that her grandmother, who has raised her since she was little, has died. Destiny initially rebukes Ramona's attempts to apologize, but at the funeral, Ramona makes amends and promises to take care of Destiny from now on.

Returning to 2014, Destiny becomes uncomfortable when Elizabeth insists on talking about Ramona and why they ended their friendship; she stops the interview when Elizabeth brings up Doug. When Elizabeth returns home, Destiny calls to finish their conversation, recalling how her friendship with Ramona—and their crime ring—fell apart. She explains that Ramona's continued callousness drove a wedge between the girls, and Destiny could no longer justify her crimes. Doug was one of her last targets, whom Destiny viewed as a genuinely nice person, as opposed to their initial targets, sleazy Wall Street bankers not held accountable for causing the 2008 market crash. Doug is able to convince the police to take his claims seriously because he has evidence of the group's crime, leading to Dawn being picked up by the police and quickly agreeing to wear a wire to implicate Destiny and Ramona; the investigators manage to locate several other corroborating victims. Destiny, Ramona, Annabelle, and Mercedes are arrested, but only Destiny takes a plea deal to serve no jail time, because she does not want her daughter to grow up without a mother the way she did. Ramona is sentenced to five years of probation, while the others serve short jail sentences on weekends before being released on probation.

Sometime later, Elizabeth receives a call from Destiny, who has read the article and asks her if Ramona ever said anything about her. Elizabeth reveals that she only interviewed Ramona once, during which she explains that after an incident she started to keep her most valued possessions with her at all times, including a cherished photo of Destiny. Ramona fondly expresses that she could never understand how Destiny's parents could have abandoned her. At the end of their call, Elizabeth encourages Destiny to reach out to Ramona.

Cast

Production
In February 2016, it was announced that Jessica Elbaum, Will Ferrell and Adam McKay would produce Hustlers, under their Gloria Sanchez Productions banner. The film was also produced by Elaine Goldsmith-Thomas, and Jennifer Lopez through Nuyorican Productions. In May 2016, Annapurna Pictures was announced to co-produce and finance the film, with the studio's Megan Ellison and Chelsea Barnard serving as executive producers. In October 2018, it was announced Annapurna had dropped the film, with STX Entertainment acquiring distribution rights to the film. Annapurna allegedly dropped the film due to budget concerns.

Hustlers was directed by Lorene Scafaria from a screenplay she wrote. Upon first receiving Scafaria's script, Gloria Sanchez Productions first had Martin Scorsese in mind to direct, while also considering Adam McKay. Producer Jessica Elbaum stated that their initial approach was to "send this to the people that we've seen make this type of movie." After Scorsese and other directors passed on the project, producers ultimately gave Scafaria, who had refused to take on other directorial projects in hopes of directing Hustlers, the green-light to direct. Scafaria convinced the producers to hire her as director with a two-minute sizzle reel she created to demonstrate her concept. Scafaria described the "judgment that people have about strippers" as a challenge in getting the film made. According to producer Elaine Goldsmith-Thomas, who was pitching Hustlers to a range of studios after Annapurna dropped it, "[the male studio executives] were a little uncomfortable. Everybody could see the commercial value of this movie, but they were like, 'Can they just drug the bad guys? Can they just do it to the people that deserve it?'"

Casting
After being chosen to direct, Scafaria spent two years casting for Hustlers. In August 2018, it was announced that Jennifer Lopez would star in the film. Lopez was Scafaria's first choice to play Ramona, stating: "as soon as I was done, I realized, Oh my God, Ramona is Jennifer Lopez [...] It has to be her." Lopez, who plays a veteran stripper in the film, began pole dance training with professional dancer and choreographer Johanna Sapakie two and a half months before filming in preparation for a scene that has Lopez performing a major solo pole dance routine without a professional stand-in. Constance Wu joined the cast in October, after putting herself on tape, noting: "I knew that my résumé at that point didn't really have anything that would indicate that I could pull off this role." In March 2019, Cardi B, Lili Reinhart, Keke Palmer, Julia Stiles, and Mercedes Ruehl joined the cast with Mette Towley and Trace Lysette in negotiations to join as well. That same month, Madeline Brewer and Frank Whaley joined the cast of the film. Lizzo joined the cast of the film in April 2019, and Usher joined the cast in May. Scafaria had the idea to cast Cardi B, a former stripper, in the film, prompting Lopez to convince her to join the project. Lopez said: "I know she knew this world better than any of us. I told her she had to do it. And I wasn't going to take no for an answer."

Filming and design
Principal photography for Hustlers began on March 22, 2019 in New York City, with the shoot lasting 29 days. Production wrapped on May 3. Scenes were also shot north of the city in New Rochelle, White Plains and at the Palisades Center. According to producer Elaine Goldsmith-Thomas, the production budget for the film was $20.7 million. Cameos by Usher, Lizzo, and Cardi B, were all filmed the same day.

Hustlers costume designer, Mitchell Travers, defined the origins of the film's costumes and treatment in an interview with Vanity Fair, stating that "I knew it [had] to absolutely floor the audience, and let them know that this is not going to be like any movie that they've seen before." Travers designed the costumes for Lopez to showcase the strength and muscle tone she amassed during her pre-Hustlers training. Without running afoul of the film's planned R rating, he dreamed up the diamond bodysuit that was essentially connected by three straps. Travers commented: "We did a lot of research and development to find something that could [stretch in every direction during Lopez's dance]. It's performance wear, and really had to work for that sequence. We did a number of fittings on it. It is tailored within an inch of its life, completely custom for her."

Music
The soundtrack to Hustlers features a list of songs ranging from late 1990s R&B, dance music, indie pop, to classical interludes, including Janet Jackson, Fiona Apple, Britney Spears, Lorde, and Frédéric Chopin. As Scafaria explained: "I thought of [the film] as a musical — the songs themselves were telling a story. Most of the music choices were also written into the script, I had obviously imagined scenes to these songs, and we shot to these songs, but you never know if you're going to get the rights." The film's music supervisor, Jason Markey, got artists from Big Sean to Bob Seger to sign-off permission to include their songs in the Hustlers soundtrack; however, the film deliberately does not feature any songs from the catalogs of Jennifer Lopez, Lizzo, or Cardi B. Markey noted that, "We didn't have a score, either; every song made a statement about the scene."

Release
The teaser trailer for Hustlers premiered online on July 17, 2019. The full theatrical trailer premiered online on September 3, 2019.

Hustlers held its world premiere at the Toronto International Film Festival on September 7, 2019. It was theatrically released in the United States on September 13, 2019. The studio spent around $38 million on promotions and advertisement.

Censorship
The film was banned outright from release in Malaysia, and has received censorship in several Asian countries. The film was denied a clearance certificate by the Malaysian Film Censorship Board, for showing what officials called "excessive obscene content."

Reception

Box office
Hustlers grossed $105 million in the United States and Canada, and $52.6 million in other territories, for a worldwide total of $157.6 million. Deadline Hollywood calculated the net profit of the film to be $47million, when factoring together all expenses and revenues.

In the United States and Canada, the film was released alongside The Goldfinch, and was projected to gross $25–30 million from 3,250 theaters in its opening weekend. The film made $13.1 million on its first day, including $2.5 million in Thursday night previews. It was the biggest single day gross in STX Entertainment's history. The film went on to debut to $33.2 million, finishing second, behind holdover It Chapter Two; the opening marked the most successful in STX's history and the best of Lopez's live-action career. The audience breakdown of the opening weekend was 67% female, including 69% being over the age of 25. It dropped 49% in its second weekend to $16.8 million, finishing in fifth, and made $11.5 million in its third weekend, jumping to third.

Critical response

The site's critical consensus reads, "Led by a career-best performance from Jennifer Lopez, Hustlers is a uniquely empowering heist drama with depth and intelligence to match its striking visual appeal." On Metacritic, the film has a weighted average score of 79 out of 100, based on 44 critics, indicating "generally favorable reviews." Audiences polled by CinemaScore gave the film an average grade of "B−" on an A+ to F scale, and those at PostTrak gave it an average 3.5 out of 5 stars and a 50% "definite recommend." The film was also chosen by Time magazine, HuffPost, and NPR as one of the best films of 2019.

Christy Lemire rated the film 3 stars, describing Hustlers as "Goodfellas in a G-string... Scafaria's film is always a blast to watch, resulting in a surprising level of emotional depth." Lemire also described it as "Lopez's best screen work since her early heyday of Selena and Out of Sight..." and a "...career-best performance." Kate Erbland of IndieWire rated Hustlers an A- and describes the film as "funny, empowering, sexy, emotional, and a bit scary. The Oscar chatter for Lopez's revelatory, nuanced, and emotional turn as a brilliant con artist and better exotic dancer is no joke." Varietys Peter DeBruge writes, "flashy, fleshy and all-around impossible to ignore, Hustlers amounts to nothing less than a cultural moment, inspired by an outrageous New York Magazine profile... adapted by writer-director Scafaria at her most Scorsese, and starring Jennifer Lopez like you've never seen her before."

Justin Chang, writing for the Los Angeles Times, describes the film as "brassy and invigorating" stating that "Scafaria's clear-eyed grasp of that distinction that makes Hustlers more than just a girls-gone-wild cautionary tale, a peekaboo parade or a hypocritical amalgam of the two. The movie's empathy for its leads and its wholly justified rage against the architects of financial collapse is held in check by the knowledge that every hustle has its collateral damage." The Guardians Benjamin Lee, rated the film 4 out of 5 stars, stating that "even when films have focused on strippers as something other than window dressing, they've still been written and directed by men and have smoothed over rougher edges, turning them all into titillating one-note archetypes. Instead, Scafaria views the strip club like any other workplace, filled with internal politics and an ever-changing hierarchy of power." Beandrea July of The Hollywood Reporter stated that "Hustlers delivers on its hype while consistently doing the unexpected. Scafaria, whose last pic was the Susan Sarandon vehicle The Meddler (2015), excels at immersing the audience in the world of sex-work in clubs, quietly disabusing us scene by scene of any stereotypes about who these women are."

Emily VanDerWerff of Vox writes "as you're distracted by all that razzle-dazzle and the movie's many, many great jokes, Hustlers is quietly composing some deeply profound thoughts about the relationships women build with each other." Brennan Carley of GQ called Hustlers the best movie of 2019 to date, noting: "starting with a bang is one thing, though; maintaining that energy throughout its entire run-time is what makes this strippers-turned-criminals flick such a masterful feat." Rolling Stones film critic Peter Travers was also positive, stating that, "Hustlers doesn't pussyfoot about what goes on in those 'champagne rooms' off stage. The intent is not to exploit but to show how women manage to live and work in a predatory man's world", adding that "in Scafaria's fiercely funny provocation of a film—there's no running from the shadows—it's the women who seize control."

Accolades
IndieWire's annual TIFF Critics Survey of the 2019 best films and performances at the festival ranked Lopez's performance the best female performance as well as the fourth best performance among movies premiered at TIFF. On Time's annual best performances of the year list, Stephanie Zacharek ranked Lopez as the second-best film performance of 2019. Also, A. O. Scott from The New York Times ranked Lopez as one of the 10 Best Actors of 2019. IndieWire included both Lopez and Wu on its annual ranking of the 20 best film performances by actresses.

References

External links
 

2019 films
2019 black comedy films
2019 crime drama films
2010s female buddy films
American black comedy films
American crime drama films
American female buddy films
American nonlinear narrative films
Annapurna Pictures films
Censored films
Sexual-related controversies in film
Film controversies in Malaysia
Films about journalists
Films about striptease
Films based on newspaper and magazine articles
Films directed by Lorene Scafaria
Films produced by Will Ferrell
Films produced by Adam McKay
Films set in the 2000s
Films set in 2007
Films set in 2008
Films set in 2009
Films set in the 2010s
Films set in 2011
Films set in 2012
Films set in 2013
Films set in 2014
Films set in 2015
Films set in the Great Recession
Films set in New York City
Films shot in New York City
Gloria Sanchez Productions films
Nuyorican Productions films
STX Entertainment films
2019 independent films
2010s feminist films
2010s English-language films
2010s American films